The 2017 Ford EcoBoost 200 was the 23rd and final stock car race of the 2017 NASCAR Camping World Truck Series, the sixth race of the 2017 NASCAR Camping World Truck Series playoffs, the championship 4 race, and the 22nd iteration of the event. The race was held on Friday, November 17, 2017, in Homestead, Florida at Homestead–Miami Speedway, a  permanent oval-shaped racetrack. The race took the scheduled 134 laps to complete. At race's end, Chase Briscoe, driving for Brad Keselowski Racing, would dominate the race to win his first career NASCAR Camping World Truck Series win and his only win of the season.

Meanwhile, second-place finisher, Kyle Busch Motorsports driver Christopher Bell, would clinch his first NASCAR Camping World Truck Series championship by finishing second, behind Briscoe.

Background 

Homestead-Miami Speedway is a motor racing track located in Homestead, Florida. The track, which has several configurations, has promoted several series of racing, including NASCAR, the Verizon IndyCar Series, the Grand-Am Rolex Sports Car Series and the Championship Cup Series.

Since 2002, Homestead-Miami Speedway has hosted the final race of the season in all three of NASCAR's series: the Sprint Cup Series, Xfinity Series and Gander Outdoors Truck Series. Ford Motor Company sponsors all three of the season-ending races; the races have the names Ford EcoBoost 400, Ford EcoBoost 300 and Ford EcoBoost 200, respectively, and the weekend is marketed as Ford Championship Weekend. The Xfinity Series (then known as the Busch Series) has held its season-ending races at Homestead since 1995 and held it until 2020, when it was moved to Phoenix Raceway, along with NASCAR's other two series.

Championship drivers

Entry list 

 (R) denotes rookie driver.
 (i) denotes driver who are ineligible for series driver points.
 (CC) denotes championship contender.

Practice

First practice 
The first practice session was held on Friday, November 17, at 8:30 AM EST. The session would last for 55 minutes.

Second and final practice 
The final practice session, sometimes known as Happy Hour, was held on Friday, November 17, at 10:00 AM EST. The session would last for 55 minutes.

Qualifying 
Qualifying was held on Friday, November 17, at 3:30 PM EST. Since Homestead–Miami Speedway is at least 1.5 miles (2.4 km) in length, the qualifying system was a single car, single lap, two round system where in the first round, everyone would set a time to determine positions 13–32. Then, the fastest 12 qualifiers would move on to the second round to determine positions 1–12.

No drivers would fail to qualify.

Full qualifying results

Race results 

 Note: Christopher Bell, Austin Cindric, Matt Crafton, and Johnny Sauter are not eligible for stage points because of their participation in the Championship 4.

Stage 1 Laps: 40

Stage 2 Laps: 40

Stage 3 Laps: 54

Standings after the race 

Drivers' Championship standings

Note: Only the first 8 positions are included for the driver standings.

References 

2017 NASCAR Camping World Truck Series
NASCAR races at Homestead-Miami Speedway
November 2017 sports events in the United States
2017 in sports in Florida